Sindre Marøy (born 9 June 1982) is a Norwegian former professional footballer who played as a forward.

He hails from Hordabø and works as an engineer. He had several spells in Radøy/Manger and also played on higher levels for SK Brann and Løv-Ham. After being Løv-Ham's league top scorer in 2010, he left the club. After he retired from professional football, he rejoined the amateur side Radøy/Manger FK.

Career statistics

Source:

References

1982 births
Living people
People from Radøy
Norwegian footballers
SK Brann players
Løv-Ham Fotball players
Eliteserien players
Norwegian First Division players
Association football forwards
Sportspeople from Vestland